Gernicourt is a former commune in the Marne department in northern France. Previously part of the Aisne department, it was merged on 1 January 2017 into the commune Cormicy, in Marne.

Population

See also
Communes of the Aisne department

References

Former communes of Aisne
Geography of Marne (department)
Marne communes articles needing translation from French Wikipedia
Populated places disestablished in 2017